St Martin de Porres is a Catholic School parish school in Sheidow Park, Adelaide, South Australia catering for children from Reception to Year 6.  It is a feeder school to Sacred Heart College School, and Cabra Dominican College.

Primary schools in Adelaide
Catholic schools in Adelaide